Bavia aericeps is the type species of the jumping spider genus Bavia. In its distribution range it is the most commonly found species of its genus.

Description
The cephalothorax is brown, with some white hairs and patches, a darker eye region and black eye surrounds. The long opisthosoma is also brown, with dark brown patches and small white dots running along its length in males, and a broad median yellow stripe in females. The slender legs are yellowish-brown with dark brown femora, with the exception of the first pair, which is long, robust, and held in a way resembling a scorpion.

Distribution
Bavia aericeps is found from Malaysia to Australia, and on several Pacific Islands.

Footnotes

References
  (2000): An Introduction to the Spiders of South East Asia. Malaysian Nature Society, Kuala Lumpur.
  (2007): The world spider catalog, version 8.0. American Museum of Natural History.

External links
 Salticidae.org: Photograph

Salticidae
Spiders of Asia
Spiders of Australia
Spiders described in 1877